Elmore Rual "Rip" Torn Jr. (February 6, 1931 – July 9, 2019) was an American actor whose career spanned more than 60 years. He was nominated for the Academy Award for Best Supporting Actor for playing Marsh Turner in Cross Creek (1983). Torn's portrayal of Artie the producer on The Larry Sanders Show received six Emmy Award nominations, winning in 1996. He also won an American Comedy Award for Funniest Supporting Male in a Series, and two CableACE Awards for his work on the show, and for his roles as Zed in the Men in Black franchise (1997–2002) and Patches O'Houlihan in Dodgeball: A True Underdog Story (2004).

Early life 
Elmore Rual Torn Jr. was born on February 6, 1931, in Temple, Texas, the son of Elmore Rual "Tiger" Torn Sr., and Thelma Mary Torn (née Spacek). The senior Elmore was an agriculturalist and economist who worked to promote the consumption of black-eyed peas, particularly as a custom on New Year's Day. Thelma was an aunt of actress Sissy Spacek. The family is of German, Austrian, and Czech/Moravian ancestry. The nickname "Rip" is a family tradition among men in the Torn family, having been used by his father, uncle, and a cousin. Torn graduated from Taylor High School in Taylor, Texas, in 1948.

Torn was a member of the Texas A&M University Corps of Cadets, although he graduated from the University of Texas where he studied acting under the Shakespeare professor B. Iden Payne, and was a member of the Alpha Nu chapter of the Sigma Chi fraternity. After graduation, he served in the military police in the United States Army.

Career

Film and television 
After moving to Hollywood, Torn made his film debut in the 1956 film Baby Doll. Torn then studied at the Actors Studio in New York under Lee Strasberg, becoming a prolific stage actor, appearing in the original cast of Tennessee Williams' play Sweet Bird of Youth, and reprising the role in the film and television adaptations. Torn later helped his younger cousin  Sissy Spacek enroll in the Actors Studio.  He also appeared in the first production of his friend James Baldwin's Blues For Mister Charlie.  Along with Baldwin and numerous mutual friends he was active in the Civil Rights movement from the '50s forward, as Baldwin's biographer David Leeming relates.

One of Torn's earliest roles was in Pork Chop Hill, portraying the brother-in-law of Gregory Peck's character. He also had an uncredited role in A Face in the Crowd as Barry Mills. In 1957, Torn portrayed Jody in an early episode of The Restless Gun. In 1957, he starred as incarcerated Steve Morgan in the Alfred Hitchcock Presents episode "Number Twenty-Two", and on the same series in 1961, he played a recently released prisoner, Ernie Walters, in the Alfred Hitchcock Presents episode "The Kiss-Off". After portraying Judas, betrayer of Jesus, in 1961 epic film King of Kings, Torn appeared as a graduate student with multiple degrees in 1963 television series Channing, and as Roy Kendall in the Breaking Point episode "Millions of Faces". In 1964, Torn appeared as Eddie Sanderson in the episode "The Secret in the Stone" in The Eleventh Hour and in the premiere of The Reporter.

More military roles followed, as a Marine drill instructor in an episode of The Lieutenant in 1963 and as a GI in an episode of Combat! the next year.

In 1965, in the film The Cincinnati Kid, he played Slade, a corrupt New Orleans millionaire, who pressures Steve McQueen during a high-stakes poker game. On television that year, Torn portrayed Colonel Royce in the episode "The Lorelei" of Twelve O'Clock High. Following these roles, he had turns as a character actor in numerous subsequent films. The part of George Hanson in Easy Rider was written for Torn by Terry Southern, but according to Southern's biographer Lee Hill, Torn withdrew from the project after  co-director Dennis Hopper and he got into a bitter argument in a New York restaurant. Jack Nicholson played Hanson, instead, in a career-launching performance.

In 1972, Torn won rave reviews for his portrayal of a country and western singer in the cult film Payday. He co-starred with singer David Bowie in the 1976 science-fiction film, The Man Who Fell to Earth. He portrayed a Southern senator in 1979's The Seduction of Joe Tynan, opposite Alan Alda and Meryl Streep, and a music producer in Paul Simon's 1980 film One-Trick Pony.

In 1982, Torn played a role as a black magic cult leader in the sword-and-sorcery movie The Beastmaster. He also co-starred in Jinxed!, a comedy with Bette Midler, and appeared as an airline executive in Airplane II: The Sequel. He played a sheriff opposite Treat Williams and Kris Kristofferson in the 1984 thriller Flashpoint. Torn received an Academy Award nomination as Best Supporting Actor for his role in 1983's Cross Creek as a poor neighbor of Marjorie Kinnan Rawlings in the orange groves of Florida. He was nominated for the CableACE Award for his portrayal of Big Daddy in the 1984 Showtime production of Cat on a Hot Tin Roof. He co-starred with John Candy as a man who helps a tourist win a sailboat race in the 1985 comedy Summer Rental. He had a brief role as Sheriff Hank Pearson in Extreme Prejudice.

In 1988, he ventured into directing with The Telephone. The screenplay was written by Terry Southern and Harry Nilsson, and the film was produced by their company, Hawkeye. The story, which concerned an unhinged, out-of-work actor, had been written with Robin Williams in mind. After he turned it down, Whoopi Goldberg expressed a strong interest, but when production began, Torn reportedly had to contend with Goldberg constantly digressing and improvising, and he had to plead with her to perform takes that stuck to the script.

Goldberg was backed by the studio, which also allowed her to replace Torn's chosen DP, veteran cinematographer John A. Alonzo, with her husband. As a result of the power struggle, Torn, Southern, and Nilsson cut their own version of the film, using the takes that adhered to the script and this was screened at the Sundance Film Festival, but the studio put together a rival version using other takes and it was poorly reviewed when it premiered in January 1988.

In 1990, he portrayed Colonel Fargo in By Dawn's Early Light, a film from HBO about a fictional world war. In 1991, he portrayed Albert Brooks' character's celestial defense attorney in Defending Your Life. He was a jeweler who murdered his own nephew to steal a winning lottery ticket in an episode of Columbo that year on TV, "Death Hits the Jackpot". In 1993, Torn portrayed the OCP CEO in RoboCop 3 and starred opposite Tantoo Cardinal in Where the Rivers Flow North. This is the same year that Torn played the owner of a fictional battery company in a series of Energizer commercials in which the owner of a rival battery company hires various fictional villains to assault the Energizer Bunny and eliminate the competition. He was a naval officer presiding over a wargame in the Kelsey Grammer submarine comedy Down Periscope in 1996.

In 1997, Torn appeared in the Disney film Hercules, in which he voiced the god Zeus. Torn played MIB agency boss Zed in the 1997 hit film Men in Black, starring Will Smith and Tommy Lee Jones, a role he reprised in the 2002 sequel Men in Black II. In 2001, Torn portrayed James "Jim" Brody in the comedy film Freddy Got Fingered. In 2004, he played the iconic wrench-tossing coach Patches O'Houlihan in DodgeBall: A True Underdog Story.

Stage career

Broadway 
Torn appeared in ten Broadway plays and directed one. In 1959, he made his feature Broadway debut when he played Tom Junior in Sweet Bird of Youth, for which he won a Theatre World Award and also received a Tony Award nomination.

He returned next in 1962 in the play Daughter of Silence as Carlo, following that with a role in the 1963 production of Strange Interlude. In 1964, he played Lyle Britten in Blues for Mister Charlie, and four years later, he was Roberto in The Cuban Thing for its only performance on September 24, 1968.

In 1971, he portrayed Edgar in Dance of Death, and directed his first Broadway play in 1973: Look Away. In 1975, he portrayed the Son in the Broadway revival of The Glass Menagerie and 5 years later, portrayed Don in Mixed Couples. For 13 years, Torn was absent from Broadway, but returned in 1993 to portray Chris Christopherson in Anna Christie. In his last Broadway appearance in 1997, Torn portrayed Will Kidder in The Young Man from Atlanta.

Off-Broadway 
Torn made his feature off-Broadway acting debut as Eben Cabot in the play Desire Under the Elms, followed by Peter in The Kitchen at the 81st Street Theatre. His third off-Broadway role was Marion-Faye-A-Pimp in The Deer Park, for which he won the 1967 Obie Award for Distinguished Performance. He performed at the Lucille Lortel Theatre in the play Dream of a Blacklisted Actor, and later at the Joseph Papp Public Theater's Anspacher Theater as William McLeod in Barbary Shore. He last acted off-Broadway at the American Place Theatre as Henry Hackamore in Sam Shepard's 1979 play Seduced: a Play in Two Acts.

Torn's off-Broadway debut as director was for the Evergreen Theater with the play The Beard; he won the 1968 Obie for Distinguished Direction for that work. He next directed The Honest-to-God Schnozzia at the Gramercy Arts Theater, followed by August Strindberg's Creditors and The Stronger—in which he acted beside his wife at the time, Geraldine Page for the Joseph Papp Public Theater. Torn and Page also co-produced that production, and had previously presented the two plays along with Miss Julie at the off-off-Broadway Hudson Guild Theatre the year before.

The Larry Sanders Show 
From 1992 to 1998, Torn portrayed Artie in The Larry Sanders Show. For his work, Torn received six consecutive Emmy Award nominations as Best Supporting Actor in a Comedy Series and won the award once (1996). Torn was the only actor in the series who won an Emmy Award for his work. Other than the Emmy nominations and win, he received two American Comedy Awards nominations for Funniest Male Performance in a Series, winning once, and two CableACE Awards for his work on the series.

Later career 

Following The Larry Sanders Show, Torn appeared in many comedic roles in films. He was also known for his voice work and did voice-overs for many animated films.

In 2007 and 2008, he made five guest appearances on 30 Rock as the fictional chief executive officer of General Electric, Don Geiss. He was nominated for an Emmy Award in the category for Outstanding Guest Actor in a Comedy Series, but lost to Tim Conway, who guest-starred in the same sitcom. Torn's character was reportedly killed off as a direct result of his 2010 arrest, though Tina Fey denied this in a DVD commentary. Torn voiced the character of Hephaestus in the 2010 video game, God of War III.

Torn also appears in the music video for the They Might Be Giants song "Can't Keep Johnny Down", from their 2011 album Join Us.

In 2015, he reprised his role as Zed in a Men in Black safety video for Air New Zealand with rugby player Israel Dagg and singer Stan Walker.

Personal life

Family 
Torn was married three times, and had six children and four grandchildren.

His first marriage to actress Ann Wedgeworth lasted from 1956 to 1961. They had a daughter, Danae Torn.

In 1963, Torn married Geraldine Page, and they remained married until her death in 1987. They had a daughter, actress Angelica Page, and twin sons: actor Tony Torn, and Jon Torn (an associate professor of electronic media and film at Northern Arizona University). Torn apparently delighted in the fact that the doorbell of their New York townhouse read Torn Page.

Torn married actress Amy Wright in 1989. They had two children, Katie and Claire Torn.

Legal issues 
On January 29, 2010, Torn was arrested after breaking into a Litchfield Bancorp branch office in Lakeville, Connecticut. He was charged with carrying a firearm without a permit, carrying a firearm while intoxicated, first-degree burglary, second-degree criminal trespassing, and third-degree criminal mischief. The Connecticut State Police said Torn, who lived in Lakeville, broke into the bank thinking it was his home. In court, his lawyer told the judge his client needed help with alcohol abuse and that he could start treatment immediately in New York. Torn was released on $100,000 bail.

As a condition of his release, Torn had to be evaluated for substance abuse. On August 11, 2010, Torn was denied special probation, which would have allowed his name to be cleared of charges. The judge in the case cited Torn's history of alcohol abuse and the possession of a loaded weapon while intoxicated, which carries a minimum one-year sentence. On December 14, 2010, Torn pleaded guilty to reckless endangerment, criminal trespass, criminal mischief, and possession of a firearm, and was given a two-and-a-half-year suspended jail sentence, and three years' probation.

On-set conflicts 
Appearing as an interview subject in Studs Terkel's 1974 oral-history book Working, Torn confessed, "I have certain flaws in my make-up. Something called irascibility. I get angry easily. I get saddened by things easily."

While filming Maidstone (1968), Torn struck director and star Norman Mailer in the head with a hammer. With the camera rolling, Mailer bit Torn's ear and they wrestled to the ground. The fight continued until it was broken up by cast and crew members. The fight is featured in the film. Although the scene may have been planned by Torn, the blood shed by both actors was real, and Torn was reportedly outraged by Mailer's direction.

In 1994, he filed a defamation lawsuit against Dennis Hopper over a story Hopper told on The Tonight Show with Jay Leno. Hopper claimed that Torn pulled a knife on him during pre-production of the film Easy Rider (1969). According to Hopper, Torn was originally cast in the film, but was replaced with Jack Nicholson after the incident. Torn claimed in his lawsuit that Hopper pulled the knife on him. A trial court judge ruled in Torn's favor and Hopper was ordered to pay $475,000 in compensatory damages, but denied Torn's request for punitive damages, ruling Hopper had not acted with malice. Hopper appealed. On April 1, 1998, a California appellate court upheld the ruling for compensatory damages, and reversed the ruling for the punitive damages, requiring Hopper to pay another $475,000.

Death 
Torn died on July 9, 2019, at his home in Lakeville, Connecticut, at the age of 88 due to complications from Alzheimer's disease. He is buried at the Poughkeepsie Rural Cemetery in Poughkeepsie, New York.

Filmography

Film

Television

Video games

References

External links 

 
  (archive)
 
 
 Rip Torn at The TV IV
 Rip Torn at the University of Wisconsin's Actors Studio audio collection
 Production: Anna Christie—Working in the Theater Seminar video at American Theatre Wing, January 1993
 Rip Torn obituary: talent got trouble Sight & Sound, July 2019

1931 births
2019 deaths
20th-century American male actors
21st-century American male actors
Actors Studio alumni
American anti–Vietnam War activists
American male film actors
American male stage actors
American male television actors
American male voice actors
American people of Austrian descent
American people of Czech descent
American people of German descent
American people of Moravian-German descent
Deaths from Alzheimer's disease
Deaths from dementia in Connecticut
Film directors from Texas
Male actors from New York City
Male actors from Texas
Military personnel from Texas
Outstanding Performance by a Supporting Actor in a Comedy Series Primetime Emmy Award winners
People from Lakeville, Connecticut
People from Taylor, Texas
People from Temple, Texas
Texas A&M University alumni
United States Army officers
University of Texas at Austin alumni